"No Matter Who" is a song by Phil Collins released as the fourth single from his album Dance into the Light. The single received only a limited release across the world. The song only charted in Germany, where it reached #69.

A music video was made for the song, showing a half-sized Collins, his supporting band and the audience playing the song live on television.

The other two tracks on the CD single are "In the Air Tonight" and "Both Sides of the Story", both recorded for MTV Europe Unplugged.

Track listing
"No Matter Who"
"In the Air Tonight" (MTV Europe Unplugged)
"Both Sides of the Story" (MTV Europe Unplugged)

Charts

Credits 
 Phil Collins – drums, vocals, keyboards, rhythm guitar, slide guitar
 Ronnie Caryl – rhythm guitar, lead guitar solo 
 Nathan East – bass

Notes

External links

1997 singles
Phil Collins songs
Song recordings produced by Phil Collins
Song recordings produced by Hugh Padgham